Pedro Bleyer (born 22 May 1968) is a Bolivian fencer. He competed in the individual sabre event at the 1988 Summer Olympics.

References

External links
 

1968 births
Living people
Bolivian male sabre fencers
Olympic fencers of Bolivia
Fencers at the 1988 Summer Olympics